Jurijs Hudjakovs (born 16 February 1969) is a retired Latvian football striker.

References

1969 births
Living people
Latvian footballers
FC Metalurh Zaporizhzhia players
FC Neftekhimik Nizhnekamsk players
Zagłębie Lubin players
FK Ventspils players
Association football forwards
Latvia international footballers
Latvian expatriate footballers
Expatriate footballers in Ukraine
Latvian expatriate sportspeople in Ukraine
Expatriate footballers in Sweden
Latvian expatriate sportspeople in Sweden
Expatriate footballers in Russia
Latvian expatriate sportspeople in Russia
Expatriate footballers in Poland
Latvian expatriate sportspeople in Poland
Expatriate footballers in Finland
Latvian expatriate sportspeople in Finland